The 1987–88 Nationale 1A season was the 67th season of the Nationale 1A, the top level of ice hockey in France. 10 teams participated in the league, and Mont-Blanc HC won their second league title. Chamonix Hockey Club was relegated to the Nationale 1B.

First round

Final round

Playoffs

Relegation round

External links
Season on hockeyarchives.info

France
1987–88 in French ice hockey
Ligue Magnus seasons